Old Providence Presbyterian Church, also known as Halifax Presbyterian Church, is a historic Presbyterian church located at Providence, Halifax County, Virginia. It was built about 1830, and is a rectangular, one-story, single room, gable roofed frame structure.  It measures approximately 26 feet by 31 feet.

It was listed on the National Register of Historic Places in 1988.

References

Churches on the National Register of Historic Places in Virginia
Churches completed in 1830
Buildings and structures in Halifax County, Virginia
National Register of Historic Places in Halifax County, Virginia
1830 establishments in Virginia